From four Stores Depots in the main centres of New Zealand at the beginning of the 20th century, the Royal New Zealand Army Ordnance Corps (RNZAOC) expanded and shrank to meet the operational needs of the NZ Army, Ordnance units have been deployed worldwide and across the breath and width of New Zealand.

Description of Ordnance Units
In general terms Ordnance units can be described as:
Main/Base Depots – A battalion-sized unit, commanded by a lieutenant colonel. Usually a major stock holding unit, responsible the distribution of stock to other ordnance installations.
Central Ordnance Depots/Supply Company – Company-sized units, commanded by a major. depending on the role of the unit, the following sub units could be included in the organisation:
Provision, Control & Accounts
Stores sub-depot/platoon
Traffic Centre
Camp Equipment
Technical Stores
Expendables
Clothing
Returned Stores & Disposals
Textile Repair
Tailors
Boot Repair
Ammunition Sub-Depot/Platoon
Vehicles Sub-Depot/Platoon
Services Sub-Depot/Platoon
Bath and Shower
Laundry
Rations Sub-Depot/Platoon (after 1979)
Fresh Rations
Combat Rations
Butchers
Petroleum Platoon (after 1979)
Workshops Stores Sections – In 1962, RNZAOC Stores Sections carrying specialised spares, assemblies and workshops materials to suit the particular requirement of its parent RNZEME workshops were approved and RNZEME Technical Stores personnel employed in these were transferred to the RNZAOC.
Workshops Prior to 1947, Equipment repair workshops were part of the Ordnance organisation, types of workshop included:
Main Workshop
Field Workshop
Light Aid Detachments
Technical Stores

Unit naming conventions
Naming of Ordnance units within New Zealand was generally based upon the unit locations or function or unit.

Supply Depots were initially named based on the district they belonged to:
Upper North Island – Northern District Ordnance Depot
Lower North Island – Central Districts Ordnance Depot
South Island –  Southern Districts Ordnance Depot

In 1968 a regional based numbering system was adopted
1 for Ngāruawāhia
2 for linton
3 for Burnahm
4 for Waiouru

Some exceptions were:
1 Base Depot and 1st Base Supply Battalion, unique battalion sized unit, name was based on role not location
1 Composite Ordnance Company, a unique company sized unit, name was based on role not location

When the Royal New Zealand Army Service Corps(RNZASC) became the Royal New Zealand Corps of Transport (RNZCT) in 1979, the supply functions were transferred to the RNZAOC with the 1st number signifying the location with the 2nd number been 4 for all Supply Platoons:

14 Supply Platoon, Papakura
24 Supply Platoon, Linton
34 Supply Platoon, Burnham
44 Supply platoon, Waiouru
54 Supply Platoon, Trentham
Exceptions were:
21 Supply Company – Retained its name as a historical link to the units long history in the RNZASC.
47 Petroleum Platoon, Originally 7 Petroleum Platoon RNZASC, when Transferred to the RNZAOC, as it was based in Waiouru it added the Waiouru unit designation 4 and became 47 Petroleum Platoon RNZAOC

Unit locations New Zealand, 1907–1996

Alexandra
9 Magazines Operational from 1943. Ceased to be used by the NZ Army in 1962.

Ardmore
20 Magazines operational from 1943

Auckland
There has been an Ordnance presence in Auckland since the 1840s with the Colonial Storekeeper and Imperial forces. The Northern Districts Ordnance Depot was situated in Mount Eden in the early 1900s. In the 1940s the center for Ordnance Support for the Northern Districts moved to Ngāruawāhia, with a Sub depot remaining at Narrow Neck to provided immediate support.RNZAOC units that have been accommodated at Auckland have been:Stores Depot
Albert Barracks, 1862 to 1883.
O'Rourke Street, 1883 to 1903
Northern District Ordnance Depot, Goal Reserve, Mount Eden 1907 to 1929
1 Supply Company, from 1989, Papakura
12 Supply Company
12 Field Supply Company
15 Combat Supplies Platoon, 1 Logistic Regiment
52 Supply Platoon, 5 Force Support Company
Other Ordnance Units
Northern Districts Vehicle Depot, Sylvia Park
Vehicle Sub Depot, Sylvia Park
Bulk Stores Mangere, 1940s (Part of MOD Trentham)
DSS Fort Cautley
Northern Districts Ammunition Depot, Ardmore
Workshops
Ordnance Workshop Devonport, 1925–1941.
No 12 Ordnance Workshop, Devonport, 1941–1946

Workshop Stores Section
1 Infantry Workshop, Stores Section, Papakura 1962–1986
1 Field Workshop Store Section, Papakura
1 Transport Company Workshop, Stores Section, Fort Cautley

Belmont
Operational from 1943
MOD Trentham, Ammunition Group, Ammunition Section

Burnham
Stores Depot
1921 saw the establishment of a single Command Ordnance Depot to service all military units in the newly organised Southern Military Command. Prior to this, Ordnance stores had operated from Christchurch and Dunedin. The new Depot (later renamed the Third Central Ordnance Depot) was established in the buildings of the former Industrial School at Burnham. Re-structuring in 1979 brought a change of name to 3 Supply Company.
Stores Depot titles 1921–1996
Area Ordnance Department Burnham, 1920 to 1939
Southern Districts Ordnance Depot, 1939 to 1968
3 Central Ordnance Deport (3 COD), 1968 to 1979
3 Supply Company, 1979 to 1993
Burnham Supply Center, 1993 to 1994
3 Field Supply Company, 1994 to 1996
Officers Commanding

Other Ordnance Units
Combat Supplies Platoon. 1979 to 19??
Ready Reaction Force Ordnance Support Group (RRF OSG), 19?? To 1992, moved to Linton
32 Field Supply Company (Territorial Force Unit)
Ordnance Field Parks
3 Infantry Brigade Group OFP
Workshops
No 14 Ordnance Workshop, until 1946
Workshop Stores Section
Southern Districts Workshop, Stores Section
3 Field Workshop, Store Section

Christchurch
Stores Depot
Canterbury and Nelson Military District Stores Depot, King Edwards Barracks, Christchurch, 1907 to 1921
Workshop Stores Section
Southern Districts Workshop, Stores Section, Addington
3 Infantry Brigade Workshop, Stores Section, Addington
3 Transport Company Workshop, Stores Section, Addington

Dunedin
Stores Depot
Otago Districts Stores Depot, 1907 to 1921

Fairlie
Nine magazines Operational 1943.

Featherston
Featherston Camp was New Zealand's largest training camp during the First World War, where around 60,000 young men trained for overseas service between 1916 – 1918. An Ordnance Detachment was maintained in Featherston until 1927 when it functions were transferred to Northern Districts Ordnance Depot, Ngāruawāhia.

Glentunnel
16 magazines Operational from 1943

Hopuhopu
Hopuhopu was established in 1927 and allowed the closure of Featherston Ordnance Depot and the Auckland Ordnance Depot and was intended to service the northern regions.  During construction Hopuhopu was described by the Auckland Star as "Probably the greatest Ordnance Depot" in New Zealand Hopuhopu closed down in 1989 and its Ordnance functions moved to Papakura and Mount Wellington.RNZAOC units that have been accommodated at Hopuhopu have been:Stores Depot

Area Ngaruwahia Ordnance Department 1927 to 1940
Northern District Ordnance Depot, 1940 to 1968
1 Central Ordnance Depot (1 COD), 1968 to 1979
1 Supply Company, 1979 to 1989
1 Field Supply Company, 1984, from 1989, Papakura

Ordnance Field Parks

1 Infantry Brigade Group, Ordnance Field Park(OFP), 1968 to 1979,support to Combat Brigade Group

12 Ordnance Field Park

Workshop Stores Section

1 Infantry Brigade Group LAD, Stores Section

Other Ordnance Units

Northern Districts Ammunition Depot, Kelms Road

Kelms Road
55 Magazines Operational from 1943

Linton Camp
RNZAOC units that have been accommodated at Linton have been;Stores Depot
No 2 Ordnance Depot, 1 October 1946 to 1948
Central Districts Ordnance Depot, 1948 to 1968
2 Central Ordnance Deport (2 COD), 1968 to 1979
2 Supply Company, 1979 to 1985
5 Composite Supply Company, 1985 to 1990
21 Field Supply Company 1990 to 1996

Ordnance Field Parks
22 Ordnance Field Park
2nd Infantry Brigade Ordnance Field Park Platoon 1948-48
Workshop Stores Section
1 General Troops Workshop, Stores Section
Linton Area Workshop, Stores Section
5 Engineer Workshop, Store Section
Other Ordnance Units
24 Supply Platoon
23 Combat Supplies Platoon
47 Petroleum Platoon 1984 to 1996
Ready Reaction Force Ordnance Support Group (RRF OSG),from Burnham in 1992 absorbed into 21 Field Supply Company

Mangaroa
First used as a tented camp during the First World War and in the Second World War Mangaroa was the site of a RNZAF Stores Depot from 1943. The depot with a storage capacity of 25,000 sq ft in 8 'Adams type' Buildings was Handed over to the NZ Army by 1949. The units that have been accommodated at Mangaroa have been:Supply Depot
Main Ordnance Depot, 1949–1968
1 Base Ordnance Depot, 1968–1979
1st Base Supply Battalion, 1979–1985
ACE(Artillery and Camp Equipment) Group
5 Composite Supply Company, 1977-1979
Ordnance Field Parks
4(NZ) Division Ordnance Field Park(OFP), 1950–1963
1 Infantry Brigade Group, OFP, 1963–1968,

1st Composite Ordnance Company (1 Comp Ord Coy), 1964–19771 Comp Ord Coy was the Ordnance Bulk Holding unit for the field force units supporting the Combat Brigade Group and the Logistic Support Group and held 60–90 days war reserve stock. 1 Comp Ord Coy was made up of the following sub-units:
Coy HQ
1 Platoon, General Stores
2 Platoon, Technical Stores
3 Platoon, Vehicles
4 Platoon, Ammo (located at Makomako)
5 Platoon, Laundry
Equipped with Laundry Unit M532. The Laundry unit M532 was a trailer mounted self-contained laundry unit complete with a Generator, Washer extractor and tumbler dryer.
6 Platoon, Bath
Equipped with Bath Unit, Portable, 8-Shower head M1958. The 8-shower head portable bath unit was a liquid fuel-fired water heating plant designed to supply warm  water to each of the shower nozzles. The bath unit was self-contained with all the necessary ancillary equipment such as hoses, water heater, water pump assembly and shower stands.

Mako Mako
39 magazines operational from 1943
MOD Trentham, Ammunition Group, Ammunition Section
2 COD Ammunition Section

Mount Somers

 10 Magazines operational from 1943

Palmerston North
Palmerston North Detachment, NZAOC, Awapuni Racecourse, 1914 to 1921. Depot Closed and stocks moved to Trentham.
Ordnance Store, 327 Main Street Circa 1917–1921.
No 2 Ordnance Sub Depot, Palmerston North showgrounds, 1942 to 1946 when depot moved to Linton.

Trentham
Stores Depot
Main Ordnance Depot (MOD), 1920 to 1968
Base Ordnance Depot (BOD), 1968 to 1979
1st Base Supply Battalion (1BSB), 1979 to 1993
5 Logistic Regiment (5LR), 1993 to 8 December 1996 when Transferred to the RNZALR.

Commanding Officers MOD/BOD/1BSB/5LR

Ordnance School
RNZAOC School, 1958 to 1994
Supply/Quartermaster Wing and Ammunition Wing, Trade Training School 1994 to 1996
Workshops
Main Ordnance Workshop, 1917 to 1946
Workshop Stores Section
1 Base Workshop, Stores Section
Ordnance Field Parks
4(NZ) Division Ordnance Field Park(OFP), 1950–1963

Other Ordnance Units
HQ Ammunition Group, sections at Belmont, Makomako, Kuku Valley, Waiouru
Ammunition Proof and Experimental Centre, Kuku Valley
Central Military District Ammunition Repair Depot, Kuku Valley

Waiouru
Ordnance Sub Depots were established at Waiouru in 1940 eventually growing into a stand-alone Supply Company.RNZAOC units that have supported Waiouru have been;Stores Depot
Waiouru Sub-Depot of the Main Ordnance Depot (1940–1946) Initially managed as a Sub-Depot of the Main Ordnance Depot in Trentham, Ordnance units in Waiouru consisted of:
Artillery Sub Depot
Bulk Stores Depot
Ammunition Section
 Waiouru Sub-Depot of the Central Districts Ordnance Depot, (1946–1976) In 1946 Waiouru became a Sub-Depot of the Central Districts Ordnance Depot in Linton, consisting of:
Ammo Group
Vehicle Group
Camp Equipment Group.
4 Central Ordnance Deport, (1976–1979) On 1 April 1976 became a stand-alone depot in its own right.
4 Supply Company, (1979–1989)when the RNZASC was disbanded in 1979 and its supply functions transferred to the RNZAOC, 4 Supply gained the following RNZASC units:
HQ 21 Supply Company,(TF element)(1979–1984) 21 Supply Company was retained as a Territorial unit for training and exercise purposes, and was capable of providing a Supply Company Headquarter capable of commanding up to five sub units.
47 Petroleum Platoon (1979–1984)
44 Supply Platoon
Central Q, (1989–1993)
4 Field Supply Company, (1993–1994)
Distribution Company, 4 Logistic Regiment, (1994–1996)

Workshop Stores Section
Waiouru Workshop, Stores Section
4 ATG Workshop, Stores Section
1 Armoured Workshop, Store Section
QAMR Workshop, Store Section

Wellington
The Board of Ordnance originally had a warehouse in Manners Street, but after the 1850 earthquake severely damaged this building, 13 acres of Mount Cook were granted to the Board of Ordnance, starting a long Ordnance association with the Wellington area.

Stores Depot
Central Districts Ordnance Depot, Alexandra Military Depot, Mount Cook, 1907 to 1920
New Zealand Ordnance Section, Fort Ballance, Wellington, 1915 to 1917
Workshops
Armament Workshop, Alexandra Military Depot

Unit locations overseas, 1914–1919
Few records trace with any accuracy New Zealand Ordnance units that served overseas in the First World War. Although the NZAOC was not officially created until 1917 The New Zealand Army Ordnance Corps was constituted as part of the New Zealand Expeditionary Force (NZEF) in 1914 for overseas service only and in 1919 its members demobilised, returned to their parent units or mustered into the New Zealand Army Ordnance Department (Officers) or New Zealand Army Ordnance Corps(other Ranks)on their return to New Zealand.

Egypt
No. 12 Rue de la, Porte Rosette, Alexandria
New Zealand Ordnance Store, Shed 43, Alexandria Docks

Fiji
Ordnance Detachment, Fiji Expeditionary Force, Suva. February 1920 to April 1920

Germany 
Ordnance Depot, Mulheim, Cologne

Samoa
1 Base Depot

United Kingdom
New Zealand Ordnance Base Depot Farringdon Street, London
Ordnance Depot, Coford Camp

Unit locations overseas, 1939–1946

Egypt
New Zealand Base Ordnance Depot, Maadi, sub depots at:
Wadi Sarar
El Burg
Acre
2 NZ Divisional Ordnance Field Park
NZ Mobile Bath
NZ Mobile Laundry & Decontamination Unit
NZ Salvage Unit
NZ Base Ordnance Workshop
9 NZ Light Aid Detachment (att 4 Fd Regt)
10 NZ LAD (att 5 Fd Pk Coy)
11 NZ LAD (att HQ 4 NZ Inf Bde)
12 NZ LAD (att 27 NZ (MG) Bn)
13 NZ LAD (att 2 NZ Div Cav)
14 NZ LAD (att 2 NZ Div Sigs)
15 NZ LAD (att 7 NZ A Tk Regt)
16 NZ LAD (att HQ 5 Fd Regt)
17 NZ LAD (att HQ 5 NZ Inf Bde)
18 NZ LAD (att 6 NZ Fd Regt)
19 NZ LAD (att HQ 6 NZ Inf Bde)
2 NZ Divisional Ordnance Workshops
1 NZ Field Workshop
2 NZ Field Workshop
3 NZ Field Workshop
14 NZ Anti-Aircraft Workshop Section
Training Depot

Greece
Independent NZ Brigade Group Workshops x 3
Light Aid Detachments x 11
Brutish OFP attached to NZ Division

Italy
No 2 New Zealand Base Ordnance Depot, Bari
2 Base Ordnance Depot Advance, Senegallia
2 NZ Division Ordnance Field Park OFP sections attached to Brigades
NZ Mobile Laundry and Bath Unit
Vehicle Depot, Assisi – 1945 – Jan 1946 
Stores Depot, Perugia – 1945 – Feb 1946

Fiji
Divisional Ordnance Headquarters
Base Ordnance Depot
Division Ordnance Workshop
‘A’ Workshop Section
‘B Workshop Section
20th Light Aid Detachment
36th Light Aid Detachment
37th Light Aid Detachment

New Caledonia
Base Ordnance Depot
Division Ordnance Workshop

Solomon Islands
Advanced Ordnance Depot, Guadalcanal.  Officer Commanding and Chief Ordnance Officer, Captain Noel McCarthy.

Tonga
16 Brigade Group Ordnance Field Park
16 Brigade Group Workshop

Unit locations overseas, 1945–1996

Japan
Base Ordnance Depot, Kure (RAOC unit, NZAOC personnel attached)
4 Forward Ordnance Depot, supporting NZ 9 Inf Brigade Group, later renamed 4 Advanced Ordnance Depot

Korea
No Standalone units but individual RNZAOC personnel served in 4 Ordnance Composite Depot (4 OCD) RAOC.

Malaya
No standalone RNZAOC units, but individual RNZAOC personnel may have served in the following British and Commonwealth Ordnance units:
3 Base Ordnance Depot, RAOC, Singapore
28 Commonwealth Brigade Ordnance Field Park, Terendak, Malaysia.

Singapore
5 Advanced Ordnance Depot, 1970–19715 Advanced Ordnance Depot (5 AOD) was a short lived Royal Australian Army Ordnance Corps and Royal New Zealand Army Ordnance Corps combined Depot in Singapore 1970 to 1971.

ANZUK Ordnance Depot, 1971–1974ANZUK Ordnance Depot was the Ordnance component, manned by service personnel from the RAOC, RAAOC and RNZAOC with locally employed civilians (LEC) performing the basic clerical, warehousing and driving tasks. it was part of the ANZUK Support Group supporting the short lived ANZUK Force in Singapore 1971 to 1974. ANZUK Ordnance Depot was formed from the Australian/NZ  5 AOD and UK 3BOD and consisted of:
Stores Sub Depot
Vehicle Sub Depot
Ammunition Sub Depot
Barrack Services Unit
Forward Ordnance Depot(FOD)

New Zealand Advanced Ordnance Depot, 1974–1989From 1974 to 1989 the RNZAOC maintained the New Zealand Advanced Ordnance Depot (NZAOD) in Singapore as part of New Zealand Force South East Asia (NZFORSEA).
New Zealand Workshops, RNZAOC Stores Section

Somalia

The RNZAOC (with RNZCT, RNZEME, RNZSig, RNZMC specialist attachments) contributed to the New Zealand Governments commitment to the International and United Nations Operation in Somalia(UNOSOM) efforts in Somalia with:
Supply Detachment, Dec 1992 to June 1993
Supply Platoon x 2 rotations, July 1993 to July 1994 (reinforced with RNZIR Infantry Section)
RNZAOC officers to UNOSOM headquarters, 1992 to 1995

South Vietnam

During New Zealand's commitment to the war in South Vietnam (29 June 1964 – 21 December 1972). The Royal New Zealand Army Ordnance Corps did not contribute a standalone unit but provided individuals to serve in New Zealand Headquarters units, Composite Logistic units or as part of Australian Ordnance Units including:

Headquarters Vietnam Force (HQ V Force)
1st Australian Task Force (1 ATF)
1st Australian Logistic Support Group (1 ALSG)

161 Battery Attachments (161 Bty Att)
New Zealand Rifle Companies
161st (Independent) Reconnaissance Flight

See also
New Zealand Army Ordnance Department
New Zealand Army Ordnance Corps
Royal New Zealand Army Ordnance Corps
Commonwealth Ordnance Services in Malaya and Singapore

External links
 To the Warrior his Arms A History of the RNZAOC and its predecessors

References

Administrative corps of New Zealand
Military units and formations of the New Zealand Army
Military installations of New Zealand
Ordnance (stores) units and formations